James Arthur Wilson is a mathematician working on special functions and orthogonal polynomials who introduced Wilson polynomials, Askey–Wilson polynomials and the Askey–Wilson beta integral.

References
Home page of James A. Wilson

Year of birth missing (living people)
Living people
21st-century American mathematicians
Place of birth missing (living people)
University of Wisconsin–Madison alumni
Iowa State University faculty